Fort Marcy may refer to:

 Fort Marcy (Virginia), earthwork fort completed in 1862, now a public park
 Fort Marcy (New Mexico), fort in Santa Fe used during the Mexican–American War and the American Civil War
 Fort Marcy (horse), American thoroughbred racehorse